C. B. King was the 21st Surveyor General of Sri Lanka. He was appointed in 1951, succeeding I. F. Wilson, and held the office until 1954. He was succeeded by N. S. Perera.

References

K